Wiccan churches are a type of organization found within some groups of Wicca, particularly in North America. While in Europe Wicca is most often organized into independent covens, in the United States some covens choose to combine to form a "church". Churches are often formed from hive covens.

Legal status
Some Wiccan and Neopagan organizations have chosen to achieve formal legal status by becoming non-profit corporations within their states or provinces, and sometimes they additionally obtain tax-exempt status in the United States under § 501(c)(3) of the Internal Revenue Code.

See also
 Covenant of the Goddess
 Aquarian Tabernacle Church
 Wiccan Church of Canada, associated with the Odyssean Wicca path

Church, Wiccan